Phazemon, also known as Thermai Phazemoniton, was a town in the west of ancient Pontus, south of the Gazelonitis, and north of Amasia; it contained hot mineral springs. Pompey, after his victory over Mithridates, planted a colony there, and changed its name into Neapolis, from which the whole district was called Neapolitis, having previously been called Phazemonitis.

Its site is located near Havza, Asiatic Turkey.

References

Populated places in ancient Pontus
Former populated places in Turkey
Roman towns and cities in Turkey
Populated places of the Byzantine Empire
Coloniae (Roman)
History of Samsun Province